Ready or Not is a 2009 independent American comedy film directed by Sean Doyle and written by Doyle and Travis Kurtz. The film stars Christian Oliver, Seamus Dever, Evan Helmuth, and Jonathan Murphy as four college friends who become stranded in Mexico during a bachelor party.

Plot
Four college friends, led by best man Marc, attend a bachelor party in Las Vegas for Chris, who is getting married in six days. Marc convinces them to extend the celebration by taking a plane to Mexico, where they become stranded.  Now they must get back to the United States in time for Chris' wedding.

Cast
 Christian Oliver as Chris
 Seamus Dever as Marc
 Evan Helmuth as Lawrence 
 Jonathan Murphy as Dean
 Alex Rocco as Don Julio
 Fernanda Romero as Puri
 Marco Rodríguez as Pedro
 Jordi Vilasuso as El Solo, the matador
 Andrea Bogart as Kelly, Chris' fiancée
 Ray Santiago as Nacho

References

2009 films
2000s adventure comedy-drama films
2000s buddy films
2000s road comedy-drama films
American adventure comedy-drama films
American buddy comedy-drama films
American road comedy-drama films
Films set in Mexico
Films set in the Las Vegas Valley
2009 comedy films
2009 drama films
2000s English-language films
2000s American films